William Smyth (1846–1899) was a politician in Queensland, Australia. He was a Member of the Queensland Legislative Assembly for Gympie. He was mayor of Gympie from 1883 to 1884.  He built and occupied 30 Lady Mary Terrace, Gympie.

References

External links

Members of the Queensland Legislative Assembly
1846 births
1899 deaths
19th-century Australian politicians
Burials at Brookwood Cemetery